John Churchill Dunn (4 March 1934 – 27 November 2004) was a British disc jockey and radio presenter known for hosting the weekday drivetime show on BBC Radio 2 between 1976 and 1998.

Early life 
Dunn was born in Glasgow, Scotland.

Career 
Dunn's career spanned more than 30 years and he was named Radio Personality of the Year three times. Dunn began his broadcasting career in the RAF, before he joined the BBC External Service in 1956 as a studio manager. He then became an announcer for domestic BBC Radio in the 1960s, stating "Here is the news – in English" after Emperor Rosko's first show on the first day of BBC Radio 1 in 1967.

Dunn became one of the presenters of Radio 2's Breakfast Special with the start of the new networks, and the regular presenter from January 1970, but in 1972 he effectively swapped places with Terry Wogan when the latter took over the breakfast show, whilst Dunn moved to the 3 pm to 5 pm slot The Dunn Thing. This did not last too long, and in 1974 Dunn spent a year presenting Late Night Extra. In the mid-1970s, Dunn briefly returned to his previous role as an announcer and newsreader, but he moved to his long running drive time Radio 2 programme in 1976. 

After guesting on his drivetime show, writer/broadcaster Terence Pettigrew reversed their roles by inviting Dunn onto his BBC Radio 2 programme Caught in the Draft, a documentary about compulsory national service, which had originated during the Second World War and ended at the beginning of the 1960s. Like Pettigrew, Dunn had been conscripted, and begun his broadcasting career while in the forces.

From 1972 to 1975, Dunn also presented the Radio 4 children's programme Fourth Dimension. This was a magazine programme comprising a mixture of documentary features, drama series and stories. In 1979, Dunn provided the BBC TV commentary at the Eurovision Song Contest, held that year in Jerusalem, and was the commentator for the United Kingdom. In 1996, he presented his show live from Antarctica.

He remained in the early evenings until his last show on 2 October 1998, when he announced that he was retiring and that Johnnie Walker was to be taking over the show. From then on, he continued to present documentaries for the network, as well as editions of Friday Night is Music Night.

Awards and honours 
In 1998, John Dunn was awarded a Gold Sony Radio Award for the best drivetime music programme.

Personal life 
He was married with two daughters, and lived in Croydon, Surrey, where he died on 27 November 2004, aged 70, after a long battle with cancer.

References 

1934 births
2004 deaths
BBC Radio 2 presenters
British radio DJs
British radio personalities
Deaths from cancer in England
Mass media people from Glasgow